Centrosomal protein of 97 kDa (Cep97), also known as leucine-rich repeat and IQ domain-containing protein 2 (LRRIQ2), is a protein that in humans is encoded by the CEP97 gene.

Cep97 along with CP110 inhibit generation of cilia.

References

External links

Further reading

Centrosome